Anastarzia Anaquway is the stage name of Jermaine Aranha (born 21 January 1982), a Bahamian drag queen based in East York, Toronto. She is the first and only Bahamian to be featured in the Drag Race franchise, competing in the first season of Canada's Drag Race.

Career 
Aranha was inspired to pursue drag by a local queen Victoria Diamond at a fashion show in 2002. Attending the Rainbow Ball that summer, Anastarzia Anaquway made her pageant debut the following year in Miss Bahamas. The first name is a portmanteau of the word star and the titular character of the 1997 Don Bluth film Anastasia. She has won over 15 pageants, including Miss Styles Bahamas, Miss Canada International, Miss Toronto Gay, and Miss Black Continental at Large.

In July 2021, she performed alongside BOA, Juice Boxx, Farra N. Hyte, and TroyBoy at the inaugural Drag Starz at the Manor, a new drag event in Guelph, Ontario.

Personal life
Aranha was born and raised in Nassau, Bahamas.

Aranha has opened up about his experiences with homophobia and crime in his home country. On 4 July 2013, two men shot at Aranha's car as he pulled into his driveway after work. He drove himself to the hospital with three gunshot wounds. After recovering from the attack, Aranha left for Canada as suggested by a friend. He has continued to advocate for LGBT rights in the Bahamas in general from abroad.

Aranha's story, told on an episode of the show, was met with a mixed response from Bahamians, ranging from support and solidarity, to threats and accusations of lying to make the country look bad. The police report did not indicate a motivation; LGBT+ advocates Erin Greene and Alexus D'Marco clarified that there is no hate crime legislation in the Bahamas, thus no legal framework for justice.

References

Living people
1982 births
Applicants for refugee status in Canada
Bahamian emigrants to Canada
Black Canadian LGBT people
Canada's Drag Race contestants
Canadian drag queens
Bahamian LGBT people
People from Nassau, Bahamas
Shooting survivors
21st-century Canadian LGBT people